KECA-LD (channel 29) is a low-power television station in Eureka, California, United States, affiliated with The CW Plus and MyNetworkTV. It is owned by Sinclair Broadcast Group alongside Arcata-licensed ABC affiliate KAEF-TV (channel 23) and low-power Univision affiliate KEUV-LD (channel 35). Sinclair also provides certain services to Fox affiliate KBVU (channel 28) under a local marketing agreement (LMA) with Cunningham Broadcasting; however, Sinclair effectively owns KBVU as the majority of Cunningham's stock is owned by the family of deceased group founder Julian Smith. The four stations share studios on Sixth Street in downtown Eureka; KECA-LD's transmitter is located along Barry Road southeast of the city.

History
The CW first appeared in Eureka on KUVU-LP (channel 9) as a part of the Eureka Broadcast Group, which owned CBS affiliate KVIQ and several other stations with affiliations to Fox, UPN, The WB and others. KUVU was dissolved in 2014 and Bonten Media Group launched KECA for the Eureka market.

On April 21, 2017, Sinclair Broadcast Group purchased KBVU as part of a four-station deal. The sale was completed September 1.

In June 2020, Sinclair upgraded the station's facilities to HD.

Subchannels 
The station's digital signal is multiplexed:

References

External links
 KECA info at KRCR-TV website

Low-power television stations in the United States
MyNetworkTV affiliates
ECA-LD
Sinclair Broadcast Group